A Most Violent Year is a 2014 American crime drama film written and directed by J. C. Chandor, who also produced with Neal Dodson and Anna Gerb. It stars Oscar Isaac as a fuel supplier who tries to adhere to his own moral compass amid the rampant violence, corruption and decay that threaten his family and his business. The film also stars Jessica Chastain, David Oyelowo, Alessandro Nivola, and Albert Brooks.

A Most Violent Year premiered as the opening film of the 28th AFI Fest on November 6, 2014, and was theatrically released by A24 on December 31, 2014. Despite positive reviews from critics, the film was a box-office bomb, grossing $12 million against a budget of $20 million. It won Best Film, Best Actor for Isaac, and Best Supporting Actress for Chastain at the 86th National Board of Review Awards. Among other accolades, Chastain was also nominated for Best Supporting Actress at the 20th Critics' Choice Awards and the 72nd Golden Globe Awards.

Plot
In 1981 New York City, trucking company owner Abel Morales has had several trucks hijacked, ones carrying heating oil. Driver Julian is severely beaten by two hijackers. Abel's wife Anna beseeches Abel to fight violence with violence, but he refuses. Morales and his company are under investigation by Assistant District Attorney Lawrence, who seems determined to expose price fixing, tax evasion, and various other illegalities in the heating oil business.

Morales's attorney, Andrew Walsh, brokers a deal with a group of Hasidic Jews headed by Joseph Mendelsohn to purchase a fuel oil terminal on the East River for $1.5 million. Morales makes a large down payment with the understanding that he will close in 30 days or lose his money.

After moving into a new home, Morales chases an intruder, then finds a dropped gun. He confronts his competitors but they deny involvement. A Teamsters boss suggests Morales's drivers should carry handguns with fake permits. Morales refuses, fearing for his legitimate business reputation.

Julian is again accosted by hijackers, and they shoot at each other. The police chase Julian and the others, who all escape. Morales's bank says that, due to the impending criminal indictments and this violent incident, it can no longer finance his purchase of the terminal.

Morales gets a loan from competitors Saul and Lorraine Lefkowitz in exchange for partial use of the terminal, but it won't cover the entire purchase. Morales raises more money by taking out a mortgage on a building he owns with his younger brother. Another hijacking is reported, and he stops the stolen truck. The hijacker says he sells the oil in Far Rockaway. Morales confronts a competitor who has facilities in Far Rockaway, threatening to call the authorities. Morales is paid for the stolen oil but is still $600,000 short of the purchase price.

Morales visits another competitor, Mafia-affiliated Peter Forente, to ask for the remaining money. Forente warns him that any such loan will be on onerous terms and tells him to think things through before committing to it. Dismayed, Morales tells Anna about Peter's terms and she confesses that she has been skimming from the company for years, storing the money in a secret account. Anna convinces Abel to use this money instead of a loan from Forente.

Morales and Walsh pay the note and take possession of the terminal. Julian arrives carrying a gun, clearly unstable and bemoaning his self-inflicted circumstances. After a brief exchange and a request that Morales take care of his family, Julian kills himself. Morales tells Lawrence that the broader investigations into his firm are hurting his business, and that they should find a conclusion at some point. Lawrence agrees in general terms and suggests that the new oil terminal will develop Morales' business and give him "political influence." Lawrence then hints that Morales might be able to help him with his higher aspirations. Morales claims that he has always taken the path that is "most right".

Cast

Production
On May 23, 2013, Deadline reported that filmmaker J. C. Chandor would write and direct A Most Violent Year, which was to begin shooting in the fall. Neal Dodson and Anna Gerb co-produced the film along with FilmNation Entertainment's Glen Basner as executive producer. On January 22, 2014, A24 acquired the U.S. distribution rights to the film, which A24 then scheduled for release in the fourth quarter of 2014. The film was co-financed by Image Nation and Participant Media, and produced by Before the Door Pictures and Washington Square Films.

Casting
On June 5, 2013, Javier Bardem joined the film to play the lead. On July 16, 2013, Jessica Chastain joined the cast to play the lead role along with Bardem. On December 3, 2013, Oscar Isaac officially replaced Bardem. On January 27, 2014, Albert Brooks joined the film, playing Isaac's character's attorney, and actress Catalina Sandino Moreno also joined the film in a supporting role. On January 29, 2014, while the film's shooting was underway, David Oyelowo joined the cast. Other cast members include Ashley Williams, Elyes Gabel, Harris Yulin, Giselle Eisenberg, and Elizabeth Marvel. On February 21, 2014, Alessandro Nivola was cast to play Peter Forente, a heating oil distributor who is a competitor to Isaac's character.

Filming
Principal photography began on January 29, 2014, in New York City.

Music
The musical score for A Most Violent Year was composed by Alex Ebert, who previously collaborated with director Chandor on All Is Lost (2013). Influenced musically by the culture and life of the 1980s, specifically thinking of Miami Vice and Scarface, Ebert predominantly utilized synthesizers. "It's a synthesis of sort-of calling-card themes and extended atmospheres. There’s horns and flutes and strings, but there’s also sort of these meditative synthetic beds underlying."

A soundtrack album was released by Community Music on December 16, 2014.

Release
The film had its world premiere as the opening film of the 28th AFI Fest on November 6, 2014, at the Dolby Theatre in Hollywood. The film was released in four United States theaters on December 31, 2014, by A24 and expanded from there to a nationwide release. In the United Kingdom, the film was released by Icon Film Distribution.

Reception

Critical response
A Most Violent Year received very positive reviews, with many critics comparing Chandor's style in this film favorably to the works of Sidney Lumet, and praise given to the performances of Oscar Isaac and Jessica Chastain. On the review aggregator website Rotten Tomatoes, the film has an approval rating of 90% based on 236 reviews, with an average rating of 7.8/10. The website's consensus reads: "Gritty, gripping, and weighted with thought-provoking heft, A Most Violent Year represents another strong entry in writer-director J.C. Chandor's impressive filmography." Metacritic, which uses a weighted average, assigned the film a score of 79 out of 100, based on 44 critics, indicating "generally favorable reviews".

Business Insiders Brett Arnold wrote that the movie "may be slow, but it's never dull." Varietys Scott Foundas compared it to Chandor's previous film saying the movie is "a tough, gritty, richly atmospheric thriller that lacks some of the formal razzle-dazzle of his solo seafaring epic, 'All Is Lost,' but makes up for it with an impressively sustained low-boil tension and the skillful navigating of a complex plot." The Wraps Alonso Duralde praised the director, proclaiming that Chandor "firmly plants himself among this generation's great filmmakers."

Top-ten lists
A Most Violent Year was listed on many critics' top 10 lists.

 1st – Christopher Orr, The Atlantic
 3rd – Brian Tallerico, RogerEbert.com
 3rd – Mick LaSalle, San Francisco Chronicle
 5th – Joe Neumaier, New York Daily News
 6th – Kristopher Tapley, HitFix
 7th – Kimberly Jones, Austin Chronicle
 8th – Gregory Ellwood, HitFix
 8th – Todd McCarthy, The Hollywood Reporter
 9th – Alonso Duralde, TheWrap
 9th – Christy Lemire, RogerEbert.com
 9th – Bill Goodykoontz, The Arizona Republic
 9th – Richard Roeper, Chicago Sun-Times
 9th – Betsy Sharkey, Los Angeles Times (tied with Inherent Vice)
 Top 10 (ranked alphabetically) – David Denby, The New Yorker
 Top 10 (ranked alphabetically) – Calvin Wilson, St. Louis Post-Dispatch
 Best of 2014 (listed alphabetically, not ranked) – Kenneth Turan, Los Angeles Times

Accolades

References

External links
 
 
 
 

2014 films
2014 action thriller films
2014 crime thriller films
American action thriller films
American business films
American crime thriller films
American romantic drama films
Films directed by J. C. Chandor
Films shot in New York City
Films set in New York City
Films set in 1981
FilmNation Entertainment films
Participant (company) films
A24 (company) films
Heating oil
Films shot in Detroit
2010s English-language films
2010s American films